Lishui Airport is a civil and military dual-use airport being built to serve the city of Lishui in Zhejiang Province, China. The airport project began in 2009, and it received approval from the national government and the Central Military Commission in December 2016.

It is scheduled to open in 2021.

Facilities
The airport will have a  runway (class 4C), a  terminal building, and six aircraft parking spots. It is projected to serve 1 million passengers and 4000 tons of cargo annually by 2025.

See also
List of airports in China
List of the busiest airports in China

References

Airports in Zhejiang
Proposed airports in China
Lishui
Chinese Air Force bases